Rachel Leland Levine (born October 28, 1957) is an American pediatrician who has served as the United States assistant secretary for health since March 26, 2021. She is also an admiral in the United States Public Health Service Commissioned Corps.

Levine is a professor of pediatrics and psychiatry at the Penn State College of Medicine, and previously served as the Pennsylvania physician general from 2015 to 2017 and as secretary of the Pennsylvania Department of Health from 2017 to 2021. Levine is one of only a few openly transgender government officials in the United States, and is the first to hold an office that requires Senate confirmation. On October 19, 2021, Levine became the first openly transgender four-star officer in the nation's eight uniformed services. 

Levine was named as one of USA Today'''s women of the year in 2022, which recognizes women who have made a significant impact on society.

Early life and education 
Born on October 28, 1957, Levine is originally from Wakefield, Massachusetts. Her parents, Melvin and Lillian Levine, were both lawyers. Her sister, Bonnie Levine, is four years older. Levine is Jewish and grew up attending Hebrew school. Levine earned a high school diploma from Belmont Hill School in Belmont, Massachusetts.

Levine graduated from Harvard College and the Tulane University School of Medicine and completed a residency in pediatrics and a postdoctoral fellowship in adolescent medicine at the Mount Sinai Medical Center in Manhattan, New York.

 Career 
After completing her training in pediatrics and psychiatry at New York City's Mount Sinai Hospital, Levine moved from Manhattan to central Pennsylvania in 1993 where she joined the faculty of the Penn State College of Medicine and the staff at Penn State Hershey Medical Center. During her tenure, she created Penn State Hershey Medical Center's Division of Adolescent Medicine and the Penn State Hershey Eating Disorders Program. She was in charge of the latter when she was nominated for the position of Pennsylvania physician general in 2015.

 Pennsylvania Department of Health 
In 2015, Levine was nominated by Pennsylvania Governor-elect Tom Wolf to serve as Pennsylvania's physician general. In one of her most lauded actions as physician general, Levine signed an order allowing law enforcement officers to carry naloxone.

In July 2017, Governor Wolf appointed Levine as Secretary of Health, and she was unanimously confirmed by the Pennsylvania State Senate.

 COVID-19 response 

During 2020 and until January 23, 2021, Levine led the public health response on COVID-19 in Pennsylvania as the state secretary of health. She worked closely on a daily basis with the FEMA director and led a daily press briefing. Along with Gov. Tom Wolf, Levine faced criticism from a few Republican leaders over her handling of the pandemic, particularly with regard to nursing home patients.

On March 18, 2020, Levine directed Pennsylvania nursing homes to admit new patients, including stable patients recovering from the COVID-19 virus who were released from the hospital. Despite warnings from nursing home trade groups that such policies could unnecessarily cost more lives, there is no evidence that Levine placed COVID-positive patients in nursing home facilities or that her decision resulted in excess death among the elderly. Levine was also criticized for mishandling COVID data reporting and insufficiently addressing the long-standing oversight problems in Pennsylvania nursing homes that were exacerbated by the COVID-19 pandemic. Levine faced further scrutiny in May 2020, when she moved her own mother out of a nursing home. In defending the move, Levine said, "My mother requested, and my sister and I, as her children, complied," describing her mother as "more than competent to make her own decisions." These issues were momentarily highlighted by Republican lawmakers after President Biden nominated Levine for Assistant Secretary for Health. However, Levine's leadership during the COVID-19 pandemic has been widely praised as calm and steadfast by many Pennsylvanians and local media outlets.

 Biden administration 

On February 13, 2021, President Joe Biden formally nominated Levine to serve as Assistant Secretary for Health. Her confirmation hearing with the Senate HELP Committee took place on February 25. On March 17, the committee voted 13–9 to advance her nomination for a full Senate vote. On March 24, the Senate voted 52–48, with all Democrats and two Republicans — Susan Collins from Maine and Lisa Murkowski from Alaska — joining all members of the Senate Democratic Caucus to confirm her nomination. Levine is the first openly transgender person to hold an office that requires Senate confirmation. 

On October 19, 2021, Levine was commissioned as a four-star admiral in the U.S. Public Health Service Commissioned Corps, becoming the first openly transgender four-star officer in any of the United States uniformed services as well as the first female four-star admiral in the Commissioned Corps.

 LGBTQ health disparities 

Shortly after her confirmation, Levine told NBC News that LGBTQ youth are topmost in her mind when it comes to addressing health disparities in the United States. She cited bullying, suicide, discriminatory policies, and isolation during the COVID-19 pandemic as pressing issues among LGBTQ youth. Levine has also expressed concerns about vaccine hesitancy among LGBTQ youth who are more likely to experience medical distrust and less likely to seek medical care.

During an April 2022 speech at Texas Christian University, Levine criticized "disturbing - and frankly discriminatory - laws and actions" that many states have implemented that affect the lives of LGBTQ youth. In an interview with NPR, she cited a range of policies, including Florida's "Don't Say Gay" bill and Texas' push to investigate parents who provide gender-affirming care to their transgender children. Arguing that such policies are based on politics rather than public health, Levine encouraged people to contact the Office for Civil Rights when they feel discriminated against and vowed to provide support to those who contact her office.

 Personal life 

Levine has two children. She transitioned from male to female in 2011. Levine married Martha Peaslee Levine in 1988 during Levine's last year of medical school and divorced in 2013. She has served as a board member of Equality Pennsylvania, an LGBT rights organization.

 Honors 
Levine was named as one of USA Today'''s Women of the Year in 2022.

Awards and decorations

Publications

See also 
 List of transgender political office-holders

References

External links 

 Biography at U.S. Department of Health & Human Services
 Pennsylvania Secretary of Health profile

Living people
1957 births
State cabinet secretaries of Pennsylvania
Harvard University alumni
Tulane University alumni
LGBT government ministers
Transgender academics
Transgender politicians
LGBT physicians
Transgender women
Jewish physicians
Transgender Jews
LGBT people from Massachusetts
LGBT people from Pennsylvania
Pennsylvania State University faculty
United States Public Health Service Commissioned Corps officers
United States Public Health Service Commissioned Corps admirals
United States Public Health Service personnel
Biden administration personnel
American women academics
American women physicians